Joseph Edward Dunne (November 20, 1881 – April 8, 1963) was an American politician from Oregon.

Biography
Dunne was born in 1881 in Portland, Oregon.

He was elected to the Oregon State Senate in 1926, serving until 1935.

Dunne ran for Governor of Oregon in 1934. He defeated Peter C. Zimmerman in the Republican primary, but lost to Charles Martin in the general election, in which Zimmerman ran as an independent with the backing of farm groups. Dunne received 29% of the vote, finishing in third place out of six candidates.

Dunne was later a delegate to the 1936 Republican National Convention.

References

1881 births
1963 deaths
Republican Party Oregon state senators
Politicians from Portland, Oregon
20th-century American politicians